Ada Smolnikar-Bešter (born 1935) is a Slovenian gymnast. She competed in seven events at the 1952 Summer Olympics.

References

External links
 

1935 births
Living people
Slovenian female artistic gymnasts
Olympic gymnasts of Yugoslavia
Gymnasts at the 1952 Summer Olympics
Sportspeople from Jesenice, Jesenice